Ado Grenzstein, pseudonym A. Piirikivi (5 February 1849 – 20 April 1916) was an Estonian journalist, writer and teacher, brother of . In 1881 he founded the Olevik newspaper, which become one of the most important Estonian newspapers of the period. The purpose of the paper was  "weaning the Estonian peasant readership away from the 'firebrands and madcaps' who edited Sakala. He soon broke with the Estonian national movement and became an apologist of Russification. He even went further, expressing doubt whether the loss of the Estonian nation would be of any consequence to man-kind. His views have been characterized as "national nihilism". In 1901 he left Estonia and settled first in Dresden, and then later in Paris.

In an attempt to revitalize the Estonian language, Grenzstein tried to coin words out of nothing (see ex nihilo lexical enrichment) and introduced neologisms such as kabe "draughts, checkers" and male "chess".

References

Estonian non-fiction writers
Estonian journalists
1849 births
1916 deaths
Estonian emigrants to France
Estonian male writers
Estonian publishers (people)
Male non-fiction writers
19th-century Estonian writers
19th-century newspaper founders